Fair Hill may refer to

Places
Fair Hill, Appleby-in-Westmorland (where the Appleby Horse Fair takes place), Cumbria, England
Fair Hill, Maryland, United States
Fair Hill, Penrith, Cumbria, England

Other uses
Fair Hill Railroad; a defunct railroad in Pennsylvania
Fair Hill Training Center; a racehorse training center in Maryland